The men's 4 × 100 metre medley relay competition of the swimming events at the 1975 Pan American Games took place on 24 October. The defending Pan American Games champion is the United States.

Results
All times are in minutes and seconds.

Heats

Final 
The final was held on October 24.

References

Swimming at the 1975 Pan American Games